The Arthur L. Schawlow Prize in Laser Science is a prize that has been awarded annually by the American Physical Society since 1991. The recipient is chosen for "outstanding contributions to basic research which uses lasers to advance our knowledge of the fundamental physical properties of materials and their interaction with light". The prize is named after Arthur L. Schawlow (1921–1999), laser pioneer and Nobel laureate, and as of 2007 is valued at $10,000.

Recipients 
Source:

 2023 Demetrios Christodoulides
 2022 Tony F. Heinz
 2021 Peter J. Delfyett, Jr.
 2020 Shaul Mukamel
 2019 Steven T. Cundiff
 2018 Gérard Albert Mourou
 2017 Louis F. DiMauro
 2016 Robert W. Boyd
 2015 Christopher Monroe
 2014 
 2013 Robert Alfano
 2012 Michael D. Fayer
 2011 
 2010 , Margaret M. Murnane
 2009 Robert W. Field
 2008 
 2007 Szymon Suckewer
 2006 Paul B. Corkum
 2005 Marlan O. Scully
 2004 Federico Capasso
 2003 David E. Pritchard
 2002 Stephen E. Harris
 2001 David J. Wineland
 2000 Richard Neil Zare
 1999 Carl E. Wieman
 1998 William D. Phillips
 1997 Charles V. Shank, Erich Peter Ippen
 1996 Theodor W. Hänsch
 1995 Richart E. Slusher
 1994 Steven Chu
 1993 John L. Hall
 1992 Yuen-Ron Shen
 1991 Peter P. Sorokin

See also

 List of physics awards
 List of prizes named after people

References

Laser awards and associations
Awards of the American Physical Society
Awards established in 1991